The Jump returned for a fourth series on 5 February 2017. It is once again hosted by Davina McCall from Austria and it is broadcast weekly, same as last series. It ended on 12 March 2017 with Spencer Matthews beating favourite Louis Smith to be crowned Jump Champion 2017.

Contestants
The full line-up was confirmed by Channel 4 on 3 January 2017. Whilst not officially confirmed, it has been revealed that model Amy Willerton and former X Factor contestant Jake Quickenden have also been training as reserve contestants. It was confirmed on 2 February 2017 that model and DJ Vogue Williams had to pull out of the show due to a knee injury, she was replaced by Amy Willerton. On 13 February it was confirmed that Sir Bradley was pull out of the show due to a broken leg. Caprice pulled out of the show on 27 February 2017 due to illness after failing to appear on the previous nights episode. On 7 March 2017, Gareth Thomas withdrew from the show for "personal reasons". Lydia Bright replaced him for the final, as she was the last celebrity to have been eliminated.

Live shows
The live shows started on 5 February and will end on 12 March 2017.

Results summary
Colour key

Episode details

Week 1 (5 February)
 Event: Parallel slalom
 Location: Kühtai Saddle

Live ski jump details

Week 2  (12 February)
 Event: Snow cross
 Location: Kühtai Saddle

Live ski jump details

Week 3 (19 February)
 Event: Skeleton
 Location: Igls Sliding Centre

Live ski jump details

Week 4 (26 February)
 Event: Ski cross
 Location: Kühtai Saddle

Live ski jump details

Week 5: Semi-final (5 March)
 Event: Air jump
 Location: Kühtai Saddle

 Event: Giant slalom

Live ski jump details

Week 6: Final (12 March)
 Event: Snow cross
 Location: Kühtai Saddle

Live ski jump details (Round 1)

Event: Ski cross

Live ski jump details (Round 2)

Ratings
Official ratings are taken from BARB, and include Channel 4+1.

References

2017 British television seasons